Vikaari is a 2020 Sri Lankan science fiction horror drama short film written, directed and produced jointly by Sandun Seneviratne and Charlie Bray. It was predominantly shot in Sri Lanka and few portions were shot in the UK. The film premiered at the Los Angeles Screamfest Horror Film Festival on 15 October 2020, becoming the first film to be screened at the festival. It won the Best Short Film award at the festival.

Synopsis 
The film showcases the cultural and political depiction and crisis which was deepened and sparked by the physical appearances of the physically and mentally affected differently abled infants in countries affected by civil war. The babies born in war torn nations were surprisingly talented with possessing supernatural powers.

Cast 

 Ashan Dias
 Bimsara Premaratne
 Richard Dee Roberts

References

External links 

 

2020 short films
2020 drama films
2020 science fiction horror films
Sri Lankan short films
2020s English-language films